The 1904 Indiana Hoosiers football team was an American football team that represented Indiana University Bloomington during the 1904 Western Conference football season. In their seventh season under head coach James H. Horne, the Hoosiers compiled a 6–4 record and were outscored by their opponents by a combined total of 116 to 84.

Schedule

References

Indiana
Indiana Hoosiers football seasons
Indiana Hoosiers football